Marengo is a city in McHenry County, Illinois, United States on the Kishwaukee River. It lies approximately 60 miles west northwest of Chicago. Per the 2020 census, the population was 7,568.

Geography 

The north edge of Marengo is bordered by the Kishwaukee River

Major streets
  Grant Highway
  State Street
  Telegraph Street

History 
Marengo was first named Pleasant Grove after a grove of trees near the town site. The present name commemorates the Battle of Marengo. A post office named Marengo was established in 1844.

In the early morning of June 11, 2017, at around 4:50 A.M., a house in the northwest suburbs exploded. The gas explosion set four houses on fire and damaged 50 more, nearly 20 of which were deemed "unlivable." Despite the extensive damage, no fatalities or serious injuries occurred; only two people were reported to have suffered minor injuries.

Government
Marengo is governed by the mayor, John Koziol, and a city council of eight aldermen.

Demographics

2020 census

2000 Census
As of the census of 2000, there were 6,355 people, 2,387 households, and 1,694 families residing in the city. The racial makeup of the city was 92.07% White, 0.30% African American, 0.27% Native American, 0.28% Asian, 0.02% Pacific Islander, 5.54% of other races, and 1.53% of two or more races. Hispanic or Latino of any race were 13.00% of the population.

There were 2,387 households, out of which 38.6% had children under the age of 18 living with them, 55.9% were married couples living together, 10.7% had a female householder with no husband present, and 29.0% were non-families. 24.9% of all households were made up of individuals, and 9.8% had someone living alone who was 65 years of age or older. The average household size was 2.64 and the average family size was 3.17.

The population was spread out, with 29.3% under the age of 18, 8.6% from 18 to 24, 31.0% from 25 to 44, 19.2% from 45 to 64, and 12.0% who were 65 years of age or older. The median age was 34 years. For every 100 females, there were 96.3 males. For every 100 females age 18 and over, there were 94.3 males.

The median income for a household in the city was $50,214, and the median income for a family was $57,209. Males had a median income of $41,298 versus $26,317 for females. The per capita income for the city was $22,225. About 3.9% of families and 4.4% of the population were below the poverty line, including 5.4% of those under age 18 and 5.5% of those age 65 or over.

Notable people 

 David Boies, lawyer and Chairman of Boies, Schiller & Flexner, and lawyer for Al Gore in Bush v. Gore
 Jack D. Franks, Former Illinois State Representative, Current McHenry County Board Chairman. 
 Carl Lundgren, pitcher for the Chicago Cubs (1902–1909); born in Marengo
 Edward D. Shurtleff, Illinois state legislator, jurist; served as mayor of Marengo
 Shane Singh, journalist and former Executive Editor of Playboy magazine
 Sherman E. Smalley, Wisconsin state assemblyman and jurist; born in Marengo
 Carrie Adell Strahorn, American pioneer, explorer, and author
 Egbert Van Alstyne, songwriter

Media 

The Marengo-Union Times is the newspaper of record in Marengo, IL.  It has a circulation of 6,300 and is mailed to every home and business in the greater Marengo and Union, Illinois area.

References

External links 
 
 The Marengo-Union Times newspaper website

Chicago metropolitan area
Cities in Illinois
Cities in McHenry County, Illinois
Populated places established in 1835